The wrestling competition at the 2018 Central American and Caribbean Games was held in Barranquilla, Colombia from 29 July to 2 August at the Coliseo Universidad del Atlántico.

Medal summary

Men's freestyle

Men's Greco-Roman

Women's freestyle

Medal table

References

External links
Central American and Caribbean Games – Wrestling
Results

2018 Central American and Caribbean Games events
Central American and Caribbean Games
2018
Qualification tournaments for the 2019 Pan American Games